John Crosby may refer to:

Politics
 John Crosby (Georgia politician), state senator from Georgia
 John Crawford Crosby (1859–1943), American politician
 John Schuyler Crosby (1839–1914), governor of Montana

Others
 John Crosby (actor) (died 1724), English stage actor
 John Crosby (businessman), Australian farmer
 John Crosby (conductor) (1926–2002), founding director of the Santa Fe Opera, 1957–2000
 John Crosby (died 1476), merchant, alderman and diplomat
 John Crosby (General Mills) (1828–1887), partner of Washburn-Crosby Company
 John Crosby (media critic) (1912–1991), media critic of the New York Herald Tribune
 John Crosby Jr. (born 1951), American Olympic gymnast
 John F. Crosby, American attorney
 John O. Crosby (born 1850), African American educator and 1st President of North Carolina Agricultural and Technical State University, 1892–1896
 John S. Crosby (general) (born 1932), United States Army general
 John Sherwin Crosby (1842–1914), single-tax proponent
 Jon Crosby (born 1976), American musician

See also
 John Crosbie (disambiguation)